Trust Me, I'm a Doctor can refer to:

Trust Me, I'm A Doctor (song), the lead single of Domino Effect by The Blizzards
Trust Me, I'm a Doctor (TV series), BBC, about health matters in Britain
Trust Me, I'm a doctor, an advertising slogan for Dr Pepper